Crocus is a genus of perennial flowering plants in the family Iridaceae.

Crocus may also refer to:

Plants
Colchicum autumnale or autumn crocus, a medicinal plant in the family Colchicaceae
Pulsatilla nuttalliana, or prairie crocus, a North American plant in the family Ranunculaceae

People
 Crocus (general) (fl. 2nd-century BC), Ptolemaic admiral and governor of Cyprus
 Chrocus (fl. 260–306), leader of the Alamanni

Ships
 Belgian minehunter Crocus (M917), a Tripartite class minehunter
 Crocus class brig-sloop, a 14-gun class of brig-sloops built for the Royal Navy
 HMS Crocus, four ships of the Royal Navy
 USS Crocus (1862), a Union Navy ship

Other
 Crocus, Kentucky, US, an unincorporated community
 Crocus (mythology), a figure in Greek mythology
 Crocus (textile) or Hessian fabric or burlap, a coarse cloth
 CROCUS, a nuclear reactor operated by the École polytechnique fédérale de Lausanne
 Crocus Investment Fund, a Canadian mutual fund company
 Crocus Technology, a company developing advanced TMR sensors
 1220 Crocus, a main-belt asteroid

See also
 Krokus (disambiguation)